The list of ship launches in 1815 includes a chronological list of some ships launched in 1815.


References

Sources

1815
Ship launches